The 1887 St Austell by-election was a by-election held on 18 May 1887 for the British House of Commons constituency of St Austell in Cornwall.

The by-election was triggered by the resignation of the serving Liberal Party Member of Parliament (MP), William Copeland Borlase.  It was retained by the Liberal candidate William Alexander McArthur.

Result

References 

By-elections to the Parliament of the United Kingdom in Cornish constituencies
1887 elections in the United Kingdom
19th century in Cornwall
1887 in England
May 1887 events
1887 St Austell by-election